Seigo (written: ,  or ) is a masculine Japanese given name. Notable people with the name include:

, Japanese darts player
, Japanese politician
, Japanese dermatologist
 Seigo Nakao, head of Japanese Studies at Oakland University
, Japanese footballer

Notable people with the name include:

, Japanese footballer
, Japanese politician
, Japanese footballer
, Japanese judoka
, founder of Goju-Ryu Seigokan Karatedo
, Japanese drift driver

See also
 Seigo Kosaku

Japanese masculine given names